Trønderbladet is a local online and print newspaper published in Melhus, Norway. It covers the municipalities of Melhus, Skaun, Midtre Gauldal, Klæbu and the Gaulosen area of Trondheim. Published in tabloid format, the newspaper had a circulation of 5,116 in 2013. The newspaper is owned by Polaris Media. It has three weekly issues, on Tuesdays, Thursdays and Saturdays. The newspaper was founded in 1979.

References

1979 establishments in Norway
Melhus
Mass media in Trøndelag
Newspapers established in 1979
Newspapers published in Norway
Polaris Media